The knockout stage of the 2021 FIFA Arab Cup was the second and final stage of the competition, following the group stage. It began on 10 December with the quarter-finals and ended on 18 December with the final match, held at the Al Bayt Stadium in Al Khor. The top two teams from each group (8 in total) advanced to the knockout stage to compete in a single-elimination tournament. A third place play-off was also played between the two losing semi-finalists.

All times are local, AST (UTC+3).

Qualified teams
The top two highest-placing teams from each of the two groups advanced to the knockout stage.

Bracket

Quarter-finals

Tunisia vs Oman

Qatar vs United Arab Emirates

Egypt vs Jordan

Morocco vs Algeria

Semi-finals

Tunisia vs Egypt

Qatar vs Algeria

Third place play-off

Final

References

External links

2021 FIFA Arab Cup
2021